Daryn Smit (born 28 January 1984) is a retired South African cricketer and former captain for the Dolphins. He is a right-handed batsmen, spin bowler and wicket keeper as well as being a commentator for South African broadcaster Supersport, and has been described as 'Daryn of all trades' due to his all around talents. He has played first class, one day and Twenty20 cricket since 2004.
 
Smit gave up leg spin bowling to increase his chances of selection for the South African national team as a wicket keeper, having once been tipped as the successor of Mark Boucher. Having failed to achieve a call-up, Smit subsequently resumed bowling for the Dolphins.

Smit captained the Dolphins for a number of years but was replaced as captain by Morne Van Wyk, who was signed from South African franchise the Knights.

In March 2017, Smit signed a two-year contract to play county cricket in England for Derbyshire.

References

External links
 

1984 births
Dolphins cricketers
KwaZulu-Natal cricketers
Cricketers from Durban
Living people
South African cricketers
Derbyshire cricketers